Tom Sutherland is a former competitive rifle shooter from New Zealand.

At the 1966 British Empire and Commonwealth Games he won the bronze medal in the men's fullbore rifle event.

References

New Zealand male sport shooters
Commonwealth Games bronze medallists for New Zealand
Shooters at the 1966 British Empire and Commonwealth Games
Living people
Commonwealth Games medallists in shooting
Year of birth missing (living people)
Medallists at the 1966 British Empire and Commonwealth Games